Molla Ahmad (also Romanized as Mollā Aḩmad) is a village in Yowla Galdi Rural District, in the Central District of Showt County, West Azerbaijan Province, Iran. At the 2006 census, its population was 225 people divided into 50 families.

References 

Populated places in Showt County